George House is a historic home located at Chaumont in Jefferson County, New York. It was built between 1895 and 1902 and is a -story, three-bay square building, with a modern 1-story, one- by three-bay rear addition.  The foundation and first floor are of Chaumont limestone with second floor, verandah, and decorative detailing in wood.  It follows an American Foursquare plan.

It was listed on the National Register of Historic Places in 1990.

References

Houses on the National Register of Historic Places in New York (state)
Queen Anne architecture in New York (state)
Houses completed in 1902
Houses in Jefferson County, New York
National Register of Historic Places in Jefferson County, New York